The 2010 Major League Baseball All-Star Game was the 81st midseason exhibition between the All-Stars of the American League (AL) and the National League (NL), the two leagues comprising Major League Baseball. The game was held on July 13, 2010, at Angel Stadium of Anaheim, the home of the American League Los Angeles Angels of Anaheim, and was telecast by Fox Sports in the US, with Joe Buck and Tim McCarver in the broadcast booth. Fox also teamed with DirecTV to produce a separate 3D broadcast, the first ever for a network Major League Baseball game. Kenny Albert and Mark Grace called the 3D telecast. ESPN Radio also broadcast the game, with Jon Sciambi and Dave Campbell announcing. The National League won the game 3–1, ending a 13-game winless streak.

This was the third All-Star Game hosted by the city of Anaheim, California, which previously hosted the game in 1967 and 1989. From 2003 to 2016, the winning team earned home field advantage for the World Series.  This was the first All-Star Game the National League won since 1996, giving the NL said advantage in the World Series for the first time since 2001 – ironically, the winning pitcher, Washington Nationals closer Matt Capps, would go on to participate in the American League playoffs after his trade to the Minnesota Twins just a couple of weeks following the Midsummer Classic.

A short memorial honoring George Steinbrenner, the owner of the New York Yankees who died early that morning, was held prior to the game.

New rules
The 2010 All-Star Game marked the first time major changes took place since the 2003 decision to begin handing home field in the World Series to the winning league.  The designated hitter became a permanent fixture of the game regardless of site (a change which became more noticeable when the game was next played in a National League park – in 2011 at Chase Field in Phoenix).  But, continuing with past precedent, whereas fans voted the American League starter in, as they did in previous years when an A.L. city hosted the game, the National League's manager continued to name his team's DH before the game from the list of reserves (player-elected and manager-chosen).

Other changes included having the rosters of each league team increased to 34 players. Pitchers who started the regular-season game on the Sunday immediately before the game became ineligible to pitch in the game, and were replaced on the roster (this rule would be invoked for three players selected for the American League squad – Trevor Cahill, CC Sabathia and Jered Weaver). As with any player ineligible or unable to play, each was still recognized as an All-Star.

Finally, a modified re-entry rule also made its debut (though saw no usage in this contest). In addition to the existing injured catcher rule, the manager was now allowed to select one position player to re-enter a game in the event that the last available position player at any position is injured.

Related events

The All-Star Fan Fest, a quasi museum/theme park, was held from July 8 through 13 at the Anaheim Convention Center across the street from Disneyland. July 8 was reserved for media and VIP, while the public opening came on July 9.
The Sirius XM Radio All-Star Futures Game and Taco Bell All-Star Legends and Celebrity Softball Game were held July 11 at Angel Stadium of Anaheim. In addition, the second annual 5K Charity Run and Fun Walk was held that morning.  ESPN2 televised the Futures game, while ESPN taped the Legends and Celebrity softball game for a later telecast.
The Gatorade Workout Day and State Farm Home Run Derby also took place at Angel Stadium on July 12. MLB Network telecast the Workout Day events, while ESPN televised the Home Run Derby live, and was also broadcast in 3D on ESPN 3D.
The Chevrolet All-Star Red Carpet Parade took place on the morning of the event finishing on Disneyland's Main Street USA. MLB Network telecast the Parade on a delayed tape basis.

Final roster spot

After the rosters were revealed, a second ballot of five players per league was created for the All-Star Final Vote to determine the 34th and final player of each roster, with online balloting conducted from Sunday afternoon, July 4, through Thursday afternoon, July 8.  The winners of the final vote were Nick Swisher of the New York Yankees and Joey Votto of the Cincinnati Reds.

§ – When Bell replaced Yovani Gallardo due to injury on Wednesday, July 7, his name was withdrawn from the Final Vote ballot.

Rosters
Players in italics have since been inducted into the National Baseball Hall of Fame.

American League

Reserves

National League

Reserves

#: Indicates player would not play (replaced as per reference notes above).
*: Lee was elected as a Mariner, but was traded to the Rangers on July 9.

Game

Starting lineups

Game summary

UMPIRES:  Home Plate – Mike Reilly; First base – Mike Winters; Second base – Brian O'Nora; Third base – Laz Díaz; Left Field – Bruce Dreckman; Right Field – Jim WolfWeather – , clear; Wind 5 mph (8 km/h) from the southwest – out to center field.Time of Game – 2 hours, 59 minutes. Attendance – 45,408

Pitching dominated the first half of the ballgame, as both starting pitchers and their immediate successors put up zeroes. Both teams finally threatened to score in the fifth inning. With Justin Verlander on the mound for the American League, David Wright singled and stole second. Andre Ethier singled but Josh Hamilton was able to hold Wright at third with a strong throw from right field. With runners on the corners, Verlander was able get the final two outs of the inning. In the bottom of the inning, Hong-Chih Kuo walked Evan Longoria before allowing Joe Mauer to reach first and advance to second by throwing a ball over the first baseman's head and into the dugout. With runners on second and third and no outs, Kuo and Heath Bell were able to escape the inning by limiting the damage to one unearned run on a Robinson Canó sacrifice fly.

The game remained quiet until the top of the seventh inning. Phil Hughes allowed two singles before being lifted in favor of Matt Thornton. After getting Chris Young to pop up, Thornton loaded the bases on a walk to Marlon Byrd before allowing a bases-clearing double down the right field line to Brian McCann. Those would be the last runs scored in the game. The American League would threaten again in the bottom of the seventh. With runners on the corners and two outs, Torii Hunter struck out swinging against Adam Wainwright to end the burgeoning rally.

The bottom of the ninth would provide some drama, both on the field and in the dugout. With Jonathan Broxton in to close the game, David Ortiz hit a leadoff single to right. However, Ortiz was not lifted for a pinch runner although American League manager Joe Girardi still had Alex Rodriguez available on the bench. After Broxton struck out Adrián Beltré, Ortiz was thrown out advancing to second on a strong throw from Marlon Byrd on a John Buck single. In a controversial decision, Girardi allowed Ian Kinsler to bat despite having Rodriguez available to pinch-hit, and Kinsler subsequently flew out to center. His out not only ended the ballgame, it also ended the American League's run of dominance in the Midsummer Classic. This was also the second straight All-Star Game without a home run hit by either side.

Entertainment
The Canadian Tenors performed the Canadian national anthem in English and French. Amber Riley sang the American national anthem and Beautiful by Christina Aguilera. Colbie Caillat sang God Bless America during the seventh inning stretch.

References

External links

Official Site
2010 Major League Baseball All-Star Game at Baseball Reference

Major League Baseball All-Star Game
All-Star Game
Baseball competitions in Anaheim, California
Major League Baseball All Star Game
21st century in Anaheim, California
July 2010 sports events in the United States